War Comes to Willy Freeman is a 1987 novel by James Lincoln Collier with contributions from his brother Christopher Collier. It is the story of an African-American girl during the Revolutionary War. It is critically acclaimed but has caused controversy for its use of the words "slut" and "nigger".

Plot
The book is about a 13-year-old girl whose mother is kidnapped by Redcoats and father is killed at the Battle of Groton Heights. She runs away to her Aunt Betsy. At the end 13 year old Willy and mother are reunited. albeit in a historical context.

References

American historical novels
Novels set during the American Revolutionary War
1987 American novels